Ranee Narah (born 31 October 1965) is an Indian National Congress politician from Assam, and former Rajya Sabha MP for the state between 2016-2022. She was previously a three-term Lok Sabha MP from Lakhimpur constituency, 1998-2004 and 2009-2014, and Minister of State in the Union Tribal Affairs ministry from 2012 to 2014.

Biography
Narah is a graduate of Gauhati University. She played professional cricket as captain of the Assam state team. She was President of the Women's Cricket Association of India (WCAI) until its merger with the Board of Control for Cricket in India (BCCI) in 2006. She was a member of the BCCI Women's Committee. Narah has also served as President of the Assam Women's Cricket Association, and Vice-President of the Assam Cricket Association and Assam Football Association.

Narah was elected President of the Assam Pradesh Youth Congress in 1998. In the same year, she was elected to the Lok Sabha from Lakhimpur constituency. She was re-elected from Lakhimpur in 1999 and 2009. Narah was elected to the National Council of the Indian Youth Congress in 2003. She was appointed Deputy Chief Whip of the Indian National Congress in the Lok Sabha in 2009. In 2012, Narah was inducted into the Union Cabinet of India as Minister of State in the Tribal Affairs ministry. In 2016, Narah was elected to the Rajya Sabha from Assam.

Narah is married to Bharat Narah, a six-term member of the Assam Legislative Assembly, and former cabinet minister in the Assam government.

References

1965 births
Living people
Indian women cricketers
Indian National Congress politicians from Assam
People from Lakhimpur district
India MPs 2009–2014
India MPs 1998–1999
India MPs 1999–2004
Lok Sabha members from Assam
United Progressive Alliance candidates in the 2014 Indian general election
Women in Assam politics
21st-century Indian women politicians
21st-century Indian politicians
Cricketers from Assam
20th-century Indian women politicians
20th-century Indian politicians
Women members of the Lok Sabha
Rajya Sabha members from Assam
Women union ministers of state of India
Women members of the Rajya Sabha